For the Sake of the World is the fourth album from California-based worship collective Bethel Music. The album, produced by Brian Johnson, Ian McIntosh and Jeffrey Kunde, was released on 1 October 2012 by the collective's imprint label, Bethel Music. The album was recorded live during the weekend services at Bethel Church in Redding, California.

Critical reception

Kevin Davis, in his four star review for New Release Today, described the album as being "a sonically and lyrically refreshing work where God is exalted and His love is on display." and that the album was "created with excellence in mind and combines anointed worship and quality to create a truly epic album." Awarding the album five stars in a review for Louder Than The Music, Jono Davies thinks that the album "lets the worshipper be washed anew with the love of God by the reflective music that at times keeps a low key but then at other times builds into a wall of praise." and listed "To Our God", "For the Sake of the World" and "This Is Amazing Grace" as the standout tracks of the album. Cross Rhythms' Dave Palmer, affixing a nine-out-of-ten square rating on the album, stated that the album "feels like a very honest journey through the life of a church rather than a collection of classic tracks or the next big hits, but it will certainly touch many worshippers." Writing for Revival Magazine, Naomi Parnell says: "The worship is sincere and the lyrics are honouring, which leads me into God's presence with expectancy and reminds me of His goodness and sovereignty." In a review for BREATHEcast, Timothy Yap listed "Who You Are", "For the Sake of the World" and "Forgiven" as the prime cuts of the album and stated that Bethel Music "have made worship music three dimensional where God is not just sung about but He is experienced." Yap also commented that "these songs make you want to sing-a-long regardless of whether you are a Christian or not." and that the album also has "a more polished, slick and a grander production" compared to Bethel Music's preceding release, The Loft Sessions. Reviewing the album for The Esther Project, Alexis Wisniewski refers to the collection as "13 songs that are genuine and passionate, you can't help but engage." and concluded that "If you're a believer who likes to have good worship music at home, check this out. If you're a worship leader who is always looking for great music for your congregation, check this out." An unnamed reviewer on CBN.com said: "For the Sake of the World pulls you into a congregational worship service that is intimately moving." For the Sake of the World garnered a three star rating Jonathan Andre's review at Indie Vision Music, congratulating Bethel "for such a motivating and inspiring album". Furthermore, the CBN.com reviewer said that the songs "guide you to a place of surrender before a holy God." and went on to list "To Our God", "Closer" and "For the Sake of the World" as the highlights of the album. Steve Legget of AllMusic called the album a "power praise & worship session," and that it is "another welcome addition to the Bethel Live series."

Track listing

Personnel 
Adapter from AllMusic

Singers
 Steffany Gretzinger – vocals, backing vocals
 Brian Johnson – vocals
 Jenn Johnson – vocals
 William Matthews – vocals, backing vocals
 Jeremy Riddle – vocals
 Leah Valenzuela – backing vocals

Musicians
 Ian McIntosh – keyboards
 Brian Johnson – acoustic guitars
 Jeffrey Kunde – acoustic guitars, electric guitars
 Mike Pope – electric guitars
 Daniel Mackenzie – lap steel guitar, bass
 Brandon Aaronson – bass
 Chris Quilala – drums
 John-Paul Gentile – percussion
 Graham Moore – percussion
 Asher Stanley – cello
 Sylvia Bartel – violin
 Rebekah Van Tinteren – violin
 Allison Wyatt – violin

Production 
CD Credits
 Joel Taylor – executive producer
 Brian Johnson –  producer 
 Jeffrey Kunde – producer 
 Ian McIntosh – producer
 Luke Hendrickson – engineer, mixing
 Sam Gibson – mixing
 Hank Williams – mastering
 Walter Serafini – project coordinator
 Giles Lambert – art direction, design, photography
 Christiann Koepke – hair stylist, make-up
 Hannah Whittaker – hair stylist, make-up

DVD Credits
 Rick McDonald – director, producer
  Aaron Rich – cinematography, editing
 Jeff Aaronson – camera operator, video producer
 Stephen Casey – camera operator, video producer
 Josh Colegrove – camera operator, video producer
 Libby Friz – camera operator, video producer
 Ryan Harris – camera operator, video producer
 Toby Johnston – camera operator, video producer
 Shea McCloughin – camera operator, video producer
 Sarah Meng – camera operator, video producer
 Harry Omensetter – camera operator, video producer
 Sarah Oliveira – camera operator, video producer
 Breanna Patterson – camera operator, video producer
 Jenni Patterson – camera operator, video producer
 Peter Ralph – camera operator, video operator
 Anthony West – camera operator, video producer
 Miguel Cruz – camera operator
 Nathan Grubbs – camera operator
 Mike Myers — camera operator
 Chris Jones – technical director
 Tim Garrison – audio technician
 Chris Greely – audio technician
 Brian How – audio technician
 Paul Vafacoffman – audio technician
 James Nichols – monitor technician
 Brett Whitefield – monitor technician
 Cory Fournier – lighting
 Gabriel Wilson – set design

Charts

References

2012 live albums
Bethel Music albums